The term East Bengal may refer to:

 The eastern part of the Bengal region, traditionally called Baṅga
 East Bengal, a former province of Pakistan and British India occupying the territory of modern Bangladesh
 East Bengal Club, a football club based in Kolkata, India